The Paraguayan Legion, was a military unit led by colonels Juan Francisco Decoud and Fernando Iturburu that was formed in Argentina during the Paraguayan War and consisted mainly of Paraguayan exiles and opponents of Francisco Solano López regime. Due to mistrust between the allied Argentina and Brazil, the Legion never developed into a strong fighting unit, as Brazilians distrusted this unit created by Argentina. They started fighting only in March 1869 but under a Paraguayan flag. 

Legionnaires dominated the Paraguayan political scene during the liberal period of the first post-war years. The first Provisional government, the Triumvirate of 1869, included two Legionnaires: José Díaz de Bedoya and Carlos Loizaga. Other members of the unit would reach the country's presidency over the next few decades, such as Benigno Ferreira and Juan Bautista Egusquiza.
 
Politically, legionnaires quickly split into the Decoud faction and the Bareiro faction. The Decoud faction was involved in the formation of the Liberal Party in 1887. The former López supporters and nationalists who in 1887 established the Colorado Party, used this to portray the liberals as traitors, despite the fact that many signers of the 1887 Colorado founding manifesto were former legionnaires as well.

References

History of Paraguay